The Snakes were a British-Norwegian hard rock band, formed by former Whitesnake members Bernie Marsden and Micky Moody in 1997. The line-up consisted of guitarists Marsden and Moody with Norwegian musicians, vocalist Jørn Lande, bassist Sid Ringsby, who later joined the Norwegian band TNT, and drummer Willy Bendiksen. The band released one live album, one studio album and broke up in 1999.

Biography
The Snakes were formed  by Whitesnake guitarists Bernie Marsden and Micky Moody, exclusively performing Whitesnake songs. Initially, the project was called 'Saints and Sinners' and was to feature other former Whitesnake band mates including, bassist Neil Murray and drummer Cozy Powell plus American vocalist John West but this never materialised. In August 1998, the Once Bitten album was released in Japan on the Pony Canyon label. Former Vagabond vocalist Jørn Lande was drafted in and TNT guitarist Ronni Le Tekrø produced the band. TNT's touring keyboard player Dag Stokke engineered the album. A live album  Live in Europe was released in December 1998, with recordings of live performances of Whitesnake songs.

Band members
Jørn Lande – vocals
Bernie Marsden – guitars
Micky Moody – guitars
Sid Ringsby – bass
Willy Bendiksen – drums

Discography
Once Bitten... (1998)
Live in Europe (1998)

References

External links
MusicMight The Snakes page
Jorn Lande's official website

English blues rock musical groups
English hard rock musical groups
Norwegian hard rock musical groups
Musical groups established in 1997
1997 establishments in Norway
1997 establishments in the United Kingdom
Musical groups disestablished in 1999
1999 disestablishments in Norway
1999 disestablishments in the United Kingdom
Rock music supergroups
Musical groups from Norway with local place of origin missing 
Musical groups from the United Kingdom with local place of origin missing